Kirby Puckett (March 14, 1960 – March 6, 2006) was an American professional baseball player. He played his entire 12-year Major League Baseball (MLB) career as a center fielder for the Minnesota Twins (1984–1995). Puckett is the Twins' all-time leader in career hits, runs, and total bases. At the time of his retirement, his .318 career batting average was the highest by any right-handed American League batter since Joe DiMaggio.

Puckett was the fourth baseball player during the 20th century to record 1,000 hits in his first five full calendar years in Major League Baseball, and was the second to record 2,000 hits during his first ten full calendar years. After being forced to retire in 1996 at age 36 due to loss of vision in one eye from a central retinal vein occlusion, Puckett was elected to the Baseball Hall of Fame in 2001, his first year of eligibility.

Early life
Puckett was born in Chicago, Illinois, and he was raised in Robert Taylor Homes, a housing project on Chicago's South Side (the escape from which he frequently referred to during his career). He played baseball for Calumet High School. After receiving no scholarship offers following graduation, Puckett went to work on an assembly line for Ford Motor Company. However, he was given a chance to attend Bradley University and after one year transferred to Triton College. Despite his  frame, the Minnesota Twins selected him in the first round (third pick) of the 1982 Major League Baseball January Draft-Regular Phase.

After signing with the team, he went to the rookie-league Elizabethton Twins in the Appalachian League, hitting .382, with 3 home runs, 35 RBI, and 43 steals in 65 games. In 1983, Puckett was promoted to the Single-A Visalia Oaks in the California League, where he hit .318 with nine home runs, 97 RBI, and 48 stolen bases over 138 games. After being promoted to the AAA Toledo Mud Hens to start the 1984 season, Puckett was brought up to the majors for good 21 games into the season.

MLB career
Puckett's major league debut came on May 8, 1984, against the California Angels, a game in which he went 4-for-5 with one run. That year, Puckett hit .296 and was fourth in the American League in singles. In 1985, Puckett hit .288 and finished fourth in the league in hits, third in triples, second in plate appearances, and first in at bats. Throughout his career, Puckett would routinely appear in the top 10 in the American League in such offensive statistical categories as games played, at bats, singles, doubles, and total bases and such defensive stats as putouts, assists, and fielding percentage for league center fielders.

In 1986, Puckett began to emerge as more than just a singles hitter. With an average of .328, Puckett was elected to his first Major League Baseball All-Star Game and he finished the season seventh in doubles, sixth in home runs, fourth in extra-base hits, third in slugging percentage, and second in runs scored, hits, total bases, and at-bats. Kirby was also recognized for his defensive skills, earning his first Gold Glove Award.

1987–1990 (First World Series title)

In 1987, the Twins reached the postseason for the first time since 1970 despite finishing with a mark of 85–77. Once there, Puckett helped lead the Twins to the 1987 World Series, the Twins' second series appearance since relocating to Minnesota and fifth in franchise history. For the season, Puckett batted .332 with 28 home runs and 99 RBIs Although he hit only .208 in the Twins' five game AL Championship Series win over the Detroit Tigers, Puckett would produce in the seven-game World Series upset over the St. Louis Cardinals, where he batted .357.

During the year, Puckett put on his best performance on August 30 in Milwaukee against the Brewers, when he went 6-for-6 with two home runs, one off Juan Nieves in the third and the other off closer Dan Plesac in the ninth.

Statistically speaking, Puckett had his best all-around season in 1988, hitting 24 home runs with a career-high .356 average and 121 RBIs, finishing third in the AL MVP balloting for the second straight season. Although the Twins won 91 games, six more than in their championship season, the team finished a distant second in the American League West, 13 games behind the Oakland Athletics.

Puckett won the AL batting title in 1989 with a mark of .339, while also finishing fifth in at-bats, second in doubles, first in hits, and second in singles. The Twins, two years removed from the championship season, slumped, going 80–82 and finishing in fifth place, 19 games behind the Athletics. In April 1989, he recorded his 1,000th hit, becoming the fourth player in Major League Baseball history to do so in his first five seasons. He continued to play well in 1990, but had a down season, finishing with a .298 batting average, and the Twins mirrored his performance as the team slipped all the way to last place in the AL West with a record of 74–88.

1991–1995 (Second World Series title)

In 1991, the Twins got back on the winning track and Puckett led the way by batting .319, eighth in the league and Minnesota surged past Oakland midseason to capture the division title. The Twins then beat the Toronto Blue Jays in five games in the American League Championship Series as Puckett batted .429 with two home runs and five RBI to win the ALCS MVP.

The subsequent 1991 World Series was ranked by ESPN to be the best ever played, with four games decided on the final pitch and three games going into extra innings. The Twins and their opponent, the Atlanta Braves, had each finished last in their respective divisions in the year before winning their league pennant, something that had never happened before.

Going into Game 6, the Twins trailed three games to two with each team winning their respective home games. Puckett gave the Twins an early lead by driving in Chuck Knoblauch with a triple in the first inning. Puckett then made a leaping catch in front of the Plexiglass wall in left field to rob Ron Gant of an extra-base hit in the third. The game went into extra innings, and in the first at-bat of the bottom of the 11th, Puckett hit a dramatic game-winning home run on a 2–1 count off of Charlie Leibrandt to send the Series to Game 7. This dramatic game has been widely remembered as the high point in Puckett's career. The images of Puckett rounding the bases, arms raised in triumph (often punctuated by CBS television broadcaster Jack Buck saying "And we'll see you tomorrow night!"), are frequently included in video highlights of his career. After Game 6, the blue seat where the walk-off home run ball was caught was replaced by the Twins with a gold-colored seat. The gold seat remains in the Twins' archives. The original home run seat armrests and hardware, as well as blue seat back and bottom, are now in a private collection of Puckett memorabilia in Minnesota after the Metrodome was torn down. The Twins then went on to win Game 7 1–0, with Jack Morris throwing a 10-inning complete game, and claimed their second World Series crown in five years.

Though the Twins didn't make it to the postseason for the rest of Puckett's career, he remained an elite player. In 1994, Puckett was switched to right field and won his first league RBI title by driving in 112 runs in only 108 games, a pace that projects to 168 RBIs over a full season. But the 1994 season was cut short by a players' strike, ending his chances for two consecutive titles.

The next year, Puckett was still performing well in the 1995 season before having his jaw broken in his final career plate appearance by a Dennis Martínez fastball on September 28.

Retirement

After spending the spring of 1996 continuing to blister Grapefruit League batting with a .344 average, Puckett woke up on March 28 without vision in his right eye. He was diagnosed with glaucoma, and was placed on the disabled list for the first time in his professional career. Three surgeries over the next few months could not restore vision in the eye. When it was apparent that he would never be able to play again, Puckett announced his retirement on July 12, 1996, at the age of 36. Soon after, the Twins made him an executive vice-president of the team and he would also receive the 1996 Roberto Clemente Award for community service.

The Twins retired Puckett's number 34 in 1997. In 2001 balloting, he was elected to the Baseball Hall of Fame in his first year of eligibility. In 1999, he ranked Number 86 on The Sporting News list of the 100 Greatest Baseball Players.

Puckett was admired throughout his career. His unquestionable baseball prowess, outgoing personality and energy, charity work, community involvement, and attitude earned him the respect and admiration of fans across the country. In 1993, he received the Branch Rickey Award for his lifetime of community service work.

Legal issues
Following his retirement, Puckett's reputation was damaged by a number of incidents. In March 2002, a woman filed for an order of protection against Puckett's wife, Tonya Puckett, claiming that Tonya had threatened to kill her over an alleged affair with Puckett. Later that same month, another woman asked for protection from Puckett himself, claiming in court documents that he had shoved her in his Bloomington condominium during the course of an 18-year relationship. In September 2002, Puckett was accused of groping a woman in a restaurant bathroom and was charged with false imprisonment, fifth-degree criminal sexual conduct, and fifth-degree assault. He was found not guilty of all counts.

Kirby and Tonya Puckett divorced in 2002.

In the March 17, 2003 edition of Sports Illustrated, columnist Frank Deford wrote an article entitled "The Rise and Fall of Kirby Puckett", that documented Puckett's alleged indiscretions and attempted to contrast his private image with the much-revered public image he maintained before his arrest. One of Puckett's companions of many years commented once that when Puckett could not play baseball anymore, "He started to become full of himself and very abusive." His weight ballooned to more than 350 pounds and he was alleged to have begun to perform lewd acts in public, such as masturbating in the parking lot of a shopping center.

Death and legacy

On the morning of March 5, 2006, Puckett suffered a massive hemorrhagic stroke at the home he shared with his fiancée, Jodi Olson. He underwent emergency surgery that day to relieve pressure on his brain; however, the surgery failed, and his former teammates and coaches were notified the following morning that his death was near. Many, including 1991 Twins teammates Shane Mack and Kent Hrbek, flew to Phoenix to be at his bedside during his final hours along with his two children Kirby Jr. and Catherine. His fiancée never left his side. Puckett died at the age of 45 on March 6 shortly after being disconnected from life support, eight days before his 46th birthday.

In the subsequent autopsy, the official cause of death was recorded as "cerebral hemorrhage due to hypertension." Puckett died at the second-youngest age (behind Lou Gehrig) of any Hall of Famer inducted while living, and the youngest to die after being inducted in the modern era of the five-season waiting period. Puckett was survived by his son Kirby Jr. and daughter Catherine.

A private memorial service was held in the Twin Cities suburb of Wayzata on the afternoon of March 12 (declared "Kirby Puckett Day" in Minneapolis), followed by a public ceremony held at the Metrodome attended by family, friends, ballplayers past and present, and approximately 15,000 fans (an anticipated capacity crowd dwindled through the day due to an impending blizzard). Speakers at the latter service included Hall of Famers Harmon Killebrew, Cal Ripken Jr. and Dave Winfield, and many former teammates and coaches.

On April 12, 2010, a statue of Puckett was unveiled at the plaza of Target Field in Minneapolis. The plaza runs up against the stadium's largest gate, Gate 34, numbered in honor of Puckett. The statue represents Puckett pumping his fist while running the bases, as he did after his winning home run in Game 6 of the 1991 World Series.

At the time of his own retirement in 2016, longtime Boston Red Sox first baseman/designated hitter David Ortiz stated that he had used uniform number 34 with the Red Sox to honor Puckett's friendship with him. Ortiz began his MLB career with the Twins.

See also

 DHL Hometown Heroes
 List of Major League Baseball annual runs batted in leaders
 List of Major League Baseball batting champions
 List of Major League Baseball career doubles leaders
 List of Major League Baseball career hits leaders
 List of Major League Baseball career runs batted in leaders
 List of Major League Baseball career runs scored leaders
 List of Major League Baseball hit records
 List of Major League Baseball players to hit for the cycle
 List of Major League Baseball players who spent their entire career with one franchise
 List of Major League Baseball single-game hits leaders
 Major League Baseball titles leaders

References

Further reading

 A children's picture-book autobiography, Be the Best You Can Be, published by Waldman House Press in 1993;
 An autobiography, I Love This Game: My Life and Baseball, published by HarperCollins in 1993; and
 A book of baseball games and drills, Kirby Puckett's Baseball Games, published by Workman Publishing Company in 1996

External links

Baseball's 100 Greatest Players (#86) The Sporting News
Official Major League Baseball tribute site
SABR BioProject: Kirby Puckett
Obituary in the Star Tribune

1960 births
2006 deaths
African-American baseball players
American League All-Stars
American League batting champions
American League Championship Series MVPs
American League RBI champions
Baseball players from Chicago
Bradley Braves baseball players
Elizabethton Twins players
Gold Glove Award winners
Major League Baseball All-Star Game MVPs
Major League Baseball broadcasters
Major League Baseball center fielders
Major League Baseball players with retired numbers
Minnesota Twins players
National Baseball Hall of Fame inductees
People acquitted of sex crimes
Silver Slugger Award winners
Baseball players from Minneapolis
Baseball players from Scottsdale, Arizona
Toledo Mud Hens players
Triton College alumni
Triton Trojans baseball players
Visalia Oaks players
20th-century African-American sportspeople
21st-century African-American people